Catlin Adams (born Nira Barab; October 11, 1950) is an American actress, acting coach and film director. 

She has coached Oscar-winning actors Jane Fonda, Nicole Kidman, Naomi Watts, Rachel Weisz, Amy Adams, as well as Brad Pitt, Kate Beckinsale,  Michael Douglas, Aaron Eckhart, Lily Tomlin, Taylor Schilling, Charlie Hunnam, Moran Atias, Megan Fox, Zoe Saldana, and others.

At 14, she became the youngest member of the Actors' Studio and studied with her teacher and mentor Lee Strasberg until his death. She also worked with other master teachers, including Stella Adler, Harold Clurman, Lee Grant, Gary Austin, and Ellen Burstyn. Catlin is a founding member of the acclaimed comedy improvisational group, The Groundings.

Adams is a graduate of the American Film Institute. Her TV film, "Wanted: A Perfect Guy," starring a very young Ben Affleck, won two Emmys and she garnered a Directors Guild Award. Four years later, Adams directed the feature film "Sticky Fingers," which she co-wrote and co-produced with Melanie Mayron. In 2013, the film was screened and awarded "The Best Comedy in the '80s that No One Ever Saw," by The Outfest.

Darren Aronofsky described Adams’ work" “She demystifies the process, breaks it down and teaches how to transform technique into an art.".

Filmography

As an actress

As a director

External links

1950 births
American television actresses
American women film directors
Living people
Actresses from Los Angeles
20th-century American actresses
Filmmakers from California
Film directors from Los Angeles
American film actresses
Directors Guild of America Award winners
21st-century American actresses
American women television directors
American television directors